In enzymology, a sucrose synthase is an enzyme that catalyzes the chemical reaction

NDP-glucose + D-fructose  NDP + sucrose

Thus, the two substrates of this enzyme are NDP-glucose and D-fructose, whereas its two products are NDP and sucrose.

This enzyme belongs to the family of glycosyltransferases, specifically the hexosyltransferases.  The systematic name of this enzyme class is NDP-glucose:D-fructose 2-alpha-D-glucosyltransferase. Other names in common use include UDPglucose-fructose glucosyltransferase, sucrose synthetase, sucrose-UDP glucosyltransferase, sucrose-uridine diphosphate glucosyltransferase, and uridine diphosphoglucose-fructose glucosyltransferase.  This enzyme participates in starch and sucrose metabolism.

References

Literature 
 
 
 
 
 
 
 
 
 
 

EC 2.4.1